V.V.'s Eyes is a 1913 novel by Henry Sydnor Harrison, which was the second-best selling book in the United States for 1913, and is considered one of Harrison's best novels, along with 1911's Queed.

Later criticism has considered the novel (and other work of Harrison) to have pro-feminist themes.

References

External links
 V.V.'s Eyes at Project Gutenberg
 V.V.'s Eyes via Google Books

1913 American novels